Gordon "Gee" Nash (born January 17, 1978 in Ajax, Ontario) is a retired professional lacrosse goaltender, who last played with the Toronto Rock of the National Lacrosse League. Nash played four seasons with the New York Saints before they disbanded after the 2003 NLL season. He was subsequently signed by the Colorado Mammoth, where he played six seasons before retiring in 2009. Nash was named NLL Goaltender of the Year in 2004.

Statistics

NLL
Reference:

Awards

References

1978 births
Canadian lacrosse players
Colorado Mammoth players
Living people
National Lacrosse League All-Stars
National Lacrosse League major award winners
People from Ajax, Ontario
Sportspeople from Ontario